John Douglas Armour (May 4, 1830 – July 11, 1903) was a Canadian Puisne judge of the Supreme Court of Canada.

Born in the township of Otonabee, Upper Canada (now Ontario), the son of Samuel Armour, he was educated at Upper Canada College, and received a Bachelor of Arts degree in 1850 from the University of Toronto. He then articled with his brother, Robert Armour, and then with Philip Michael Matthew Scott VanKoughnet.  He was called to the Bar in 1853 and practised law for 25 years in Cobourg, Ontario. In 1877, he was appointed to the Court of Queen's Bench of Ontario and was appointed as its chief justice in November of that year. In 1901, he was appointed Chief Justice of Ontario. In November 1902 he was appointed to the Supreme Court of Canada, but only served seven months before his death. Armour died in London while there on work with the Boundary Commission.

Legacy
Mount Armour, aka Boundary Peak 175, a summit on the boundary between British Columbia and the US state of Alaska, was named for him.  Justice Armour was one of the original commissioners of the Alaska Boundary Tribunal and was replaced on it after his death by A.B. Aylesworth.

Also Armour Township in Ontario, Canada, was named after him.

References

External links
 Supreme Court of Canada biography
 People of Upper and Lower Canada

Justices of the Supreme Court of Canada
Justices of the Court of Appeal for Ontario
University of Toronto alumni
People from Peterborough County
1830 births
1903 deaths
Upper Canada College alumni
People from Cobourg
Canadian King's Counsel